Zieuwent is a village in the east of the Netherlands. It is located in the municipality of Oost Gelre, Gelderland. Zieuwent has the tallest church tower in the Achterhoek region.

History 
Zieuwent was first mentioned in 1294 or 1295 as "silva Synwede", and means "dike which runs sideways". The village started to develop in the 18th century as a peat colony, and formed into a linear settlement. In 1840, it was home to 1,824 people. 

In 1795, a small church was built in Zieuwent. In 1894, Sanderink became parson of Zieuwent. In 1895, after a pilgrimage to Kevelaer, he was of the opinion that the village needed a worthy church.

In 1830, the Rosmolen Zieuwent was constructed. It was a horse powered oil mill constructed on an old farm. In 1932, it was bought by the Netherlands Open Air Museum and moved to Arnhem. It was displayed but never used. In the early 21st century, an electric engine of 1 hp was installed to simulate the horse.

Zieuwent was part of the municipality of Lichtenvoorde until 2004 when it was merged into Oost Gelre.

Sports 
RKZVC, short for Rooms-Katholieke Zieuwentse Voetbalclub, is a Dutch association football club from Zieuwent.

Notable people 
 Suzan Stortelder (born 1992), singer in the duo Suzan & Freek.

Gallery

References

Populated places in Gelderland
Oost Gelre